The 2007–08 IRB Sevens World Series was the ninth of an annual IRB Sevens World Series of rugby sevens tournaments for full national sides run by the International Rugby Board since 1999–2000.

The defending series champions, New Zealand, dominated this season's competition, winning the first five events, setting new records for consecutive tournament wins and consecutive match wins, and clinching the 2007–08 series with one tournament remaining after winning the Plate Final of the London leg. They ended with six wins out of the eight events.

Sevens is traditionally played in a two-day tournament format; however, the most famous event, the Hong Kong Sevens, is played over three days.

Tournaments
The series' tournaments, which were identical to those in 2006–2007, span the globe:

Tournament structure
In all tournaments except Hong Kong, 16 teams participate. Because of its place as the sports most prestigious annual event, the Hong Kong tournament as 24 teams. In each tournament, the teams are divided into pools of four teams, who play a round-robin within the pool. Points are awarded in each pool on a different schedule from most rugby tournaments—3 for a win, 2 for a draw, 1 for a loss. The first tiebreaker is the head-to-head result between the tied teams, followed by difference in points scored during the tournament.

Four trophies are awarded in each tournament, except for Hong Kong. In descending order of prestige, they are the Cup, whose winner is the overall tournament champion, Plate, Bowl and Shield. In Hong Kong, the Shield is not awarded. Each trophy is awarded at the end of a knockout tournament.

In a 16 team tournament, the top two teams in each pool advance to the Cup competition. The four quarterfinal losers drop into the bracket for the Plate. The Bowl is contested by the third-place finishers in each pool, while the Shield is contested by the last-place teams from each pool. In Hong Kong, the six pool winners, plus the two highest-finishing second-place teams, advance to the Cup. The Plate participants are the eight highest-ranked teams remaining, while the lowest eight drop to the Bowl.

Points schedule
The season championship is determined by points earned in each tournament. For most events, points are awarded on the following schedule:
Cup winner (1st place): 20 points
Cup runner-up (2nd place): 16 points
Losing Cup semifinalists (3rd & 4th place): 12 points
Plate winner (5th place): 8 points
Plate runner-up (6th place): 6 points
Losing Plate semifinalists (7th & 8th place): 4 points
Bowl winner (9th place): 2 points

Points are awarded on a different schedule for the Hong Kong Sevens:
Cup winner (1st place): 30 points
Cup runner-up (2nd place): 24 points
Losing Cup semifinalists (3rd & 4th place): 18 points
Losing Cup quarterfinalists (5th, 6th, 7th & 8th place): 8 points
Plate winner (9th place): 4 points
Plate runner-up (10th place): 3 points
Losing Plate semifinalists (11th & 12th place): 2 points
Bowl winner (17th place): 1 point

Final standings
The points awarded to teams at each event, as well as the overall season totals, are shown in the table below. Points for the event winners are indicated in bold. A zero (0) is recorded in the event column where a team competed in a tournament but did not gain any points. A dash (–) is recorded in the event column if a team did not compete at a tournament.

Source: world.rugby (archived)

Notes:

Light blue line on the left indicates a core team eligible to participate in all events of the series.

Player scoring

Individual points

Individual tries

Tournaments

Dubai

South Africa

New Zealand

United States

Hong Kong

Australia

London

Scotland

Notes and references

External links
London Sevens Profile on UR7s.com

 
World Rugby Sevens Series